Toronto Community Services was the department responsible for providing social services, housing and shelters for homeless, day care, and old age homes. It was part of Metro Toronto Community Services department. As of April 2005, the departments and commissioners were replaced by divisions under the City Manager and Deputy Managers.

The department was responsible for providing:
 Toronto Homes for the Aged Division
 Toronto Children's Services Division

Assets
 Long-term care facilities (all pre-1998 facilities acquired from Metro):
 Carefree Lodge, North York - 127 bed facility opened in 1967
 Kipling Acres, Etobicoke - 337 bed facility built in 1959 with upgrades 2014
 Wishing Well Manor, Scarborough
 Bendale Acres, Scarborough - 302 beds facility built 1963
 Lakeshore Lodge, Etobicoke - 150 beds built 1990
 Castleview Wychwood Towers, Toronto - 456 beds
 Cummer Lodge, North York - 391 beds 
 Fudger House, Toronto - 249 beds built 1965
 Seven Oaks, Scarborough - 249 beds built 1966-1967
 True Davidson Acres, East York - 187 beds built 1973
 Wesburn Manor, Etobicoke - 192 beds built 2003
 North York Social Services offices
 3,800 emergency hostel beds in 57 locations across Toronto
 Toronto Community Housing projects

Community Services